All Jokes Aside may refer to:

 All Jokes Aside (comedy club), comedy club in south-side Chicago
 All Jokes Aside (film), documentary about the club